Jerónimo Jacinto de Espinosa (1600-1667) was a Spanish Baroque painter. His father was the painter Jerónimo Rodriguez de Espinosa, who had relocated to that area and gotten married there in 1596. He was the third child, of six. His family returned to Valencia in 1612.

Life and work
He began his artistic training in his father's workshop, where he produced a precocious painting pf John the Baptist, showing the influence of Francesc Ribalta. At the age of seventeen he enrolled in the newly created Colegio de Pintores, In 1622, he married Jerònima de Castro, the daughter of a local merchant. The following year, he began a long series of commissions; many of them portraits of the nobility.

In his later years, he was heavily influenced by the works of Pedro Orrente, especially in his religious compositions. Ribalta's influence continued to be apparent, however.

Portraits of individual saints were another popular subject. All of his works are signed and dated, making it easy to trace his creative development.

Toward the end of his career, he received a series of commissions from the Order of the Blessed Virgin Mary of Mercy. In 1665, he working on the main altar at the church of the capuchins in Massamagrell; parts of which are now conserved at the Museu de Belles Arts de València.

He was interred at the Convent of Santo Domingo. Several works he had left unfinished were completed by his son, Jerónimo. Among the artists he influenced were Vicente Salvador Gómez, Pablo Pontons, Mateo Gilarte, and Gaspar de la Huerta.

Selected works
Retrato del padre Jerónimo Mos (Portrait of Father Jerónimo Mos) (205 x 112 cm.), Museo de Bellas Artes de Valencia.
Visión de San Ignacio (Vision of St. Ignatius), (1621), 425 x 298 cm, Museo de Bellas Artes de Valencia.
Retrato de don Felipe Vives de Cañamás y Mompalau, (1634), 207 x 130, Kingston Lacy, colección Bankes
Muerte de San Luis Beltrán (Death of San Luis Beltrán) (1653), 384 x 227 cm., Museo de Bellas Artes de Valencia.
Milagros de San Luis Beltrán (1655), Museo de Bellas Artes de Valencia (315 x 221 cm.) 
Última Cena (Last Supper) (1657), 315 x 221 cm, Santa María church, Morella
Virgen con el Niño
Aparición de la Virgen al venerable Jerónimo Calmell (Apparition of the Virgin by the Venerable Jerónimo Calmell) (1660), 168 x 136 cm, private collection.
Aparición de la Virgen a San Pedro Nolasco (Apparition of the Virgin at San Pedro Nolasco) (315 x 270 cm.), firmado y fechado en 1661, Museo de Bellas Artes de ValenciaAparición de San Pedro y San Pablo a Constantino (Apparition of Saints Peter and Paul at Constantine) (245 x 314 cm.), Museo de Bellas Artes de Valencia.Golden Legend of Jacobus de VoragineMilagroso hallazgo de la Virgen del Puig (1660), 225 x 172 cm., Museo de Bellas Artes de ValenciaRetrato del Padre Fray José Sanchís, Mercedario (Portrait of Padre Fray José Sanchís), (around 1659 and 1662), 203 x 101, University of Valencia
Inmaculada (Immaculate) (1660), University of Valencia
La Inmaculada con los jurados de la ciudad, (1662), 360 x 350 cm, Lonja de Valencia, The Golden Hall
Coronación de la Virgen (Coronation of the Virgin), (108 x 96 cm.), Ayuntamiento de Valencia, Museo de la Ciudad (City Museum).
Comunión de la Magdalena, (1665), 315 x 226 cm., Museo de Bellas Artes de Valencia.
Martirio de San Leodicio y Santa Gliseria (Martyr of Saints Leodicius and Glyceria) (1667), 270 x 192 cm., Colegio del Corpus Christi de Valencia

References

ABC. "La Gloria del Barroco" permite atribución de un lienzo a Jacinto de Espinosa, 2009–2010.

Further reading
Antonio Palomino, An account of the lives and works of the most eminent Spanish painters, sculptors and architects, 1724, first English translation, 1739, p. 105
Benito Doménech, Fernando (1987). Los Ribalta y la pintura valenciana de su tiempo. Madrid : Museo del Prado, .
Benito Doménech, Fernando, et alii (1996). Cinco siglos de pintura valenciana. Obras del Museo de Bellas Artes de Valencia. Madrid : Museo de Bellas Artes de Valencia, Fundación Central Hispano, .
Pérez Sánchez, Alfonso E. (2000). Jerónimo Jacinto de Espinosa (1600-1667). Valencia: Museo de Bellas Artes. .
García Mahíques (1995). «Jerónimo Jacinto de Espinosa y la iconografía de San Ignacio en la Casa Profesa de Valencia». Archivo Español de Arte (Spanish Arts Archive) LXVIII (271). p. 271-282

External links

 Valencia Art exhibit.

1600 births
1667 deaths
People from Valencia
Painters from the Valencian Community
Spanish Baroque painters
17th-century Spanish painters
Spanish male painters
Catholic painters